Bohdan Makuts (born 4 April 1960) is a Ukrainian former gymnast who competed in the 1980 Summer Olympics. He was born in Lviv. He was also the all-around silver medalist, vault and rings bronze medallist in the 1981 world championships. He was part of the 1979,1981 and 1983 soviet world championship teams, winning one gold and two silver team medals. He also became the 1980 world cup all-around champion.

References

1960 births
Living people
Sportspeople from Lviv
Ukrainian male artistic gymnasts
Olympic gymnasts of the Soviet Union
Gymnasts at the 1980 Summer Olympics
Olympic silver medalists for the Soviet Union
Olympic medalists in gymnastics
Soviet male artistic gymnasts
Medalists at the 1980 Summer Olympics
Olympic gold medalists for the Soviet Union
European champions in gymnastics
Lviv State University of Physical Culture alumni